The 1979 Manchester Central by-election was a parliamentary by-election held  on 27 September 1979 for the British House of Commons constituency of Manchester Central.

The seat had become vacant when the constituency's Labour Member of Parliament (MP), Harold Lever had been made a life peer on 3 July 1979.  He had held the seat since its creation for the February 1974 general election, having represented previous constituencies in Manchester since the 1945 general election.

Being held less than five months after the 1979 general election (where the Tories had won power from Labour after five years), it was the first by-election of the 1979–1983 parliament.

Results 
Manchester Central was a safe seat for Labour.  On a heavily reduced turnout, the result of the contest was a victory for the Labour candidate, Bob Litherland, who won with the same 70.7% share of the vote which Lever had won at the general election in May 1979.

Syed Ala-Ud-Din stood in protest at not being selected as the Labour candidate.

Litherland held the seat until he retired from the House of Commons at the 1997 general election.

Votes

References

See also
Manchester Central (UK Parliament constituency)
Manchester
List of United Kingdom by-elections

Central
Manchester Central by-election
Manchester Central by-election
Manchester Central by-election
1970s in Manchester